The Bjurtjärn Church is a church building in Bjurtjärn, Storfors Municipality, Sweden. Belonging to the Church of Sweden, the church was inaugurated in 1643. The church resembles the look of the Karlskoga Church, with its red-painted walls, and wooden paneling.

The church building was expanded in 1671.

The Linroth family donated various items to the church, including an altarpiece.

References

Works cited

External links 

 

17th-century Church of Sweden church buildings
Buildings and structures in Storfors Municipality
Wooden churches in Sweden